Rivero may refer to:

Rivero Island, in Chile
Villa Rivero, a village in the Cochabamba Department, Bolivia
 Rivero (surname)